Paulo Batista Junior (born 27 January 1993) is a Brazilian field hockey player. He competed in the men's field hockey tournament at the 2016 Summer Olympics.

References

1993 births
Living people
Brazilian male field hockey players
Olympic field hockey players of Brazil
Field hockey players at the 2016 Summer Olympics
Place of birth missing (living people)
21st-century Brazilian people